was a private junior college located at Kita-ku, Kyoto in Japan. The College was opened in 1950 and closed in 2021. The remaining work was taken over by the Otani University.

Courses available 
 Department of Buddhism studies
 Department of childcare

External links
 Otani University Junior College

Private universities and colleges in Japan
Japanese junior colleges
Ōtani University
Educational institutions disestablished in 2021
2021 disestablishments in Japan